
Year 482 BC was a year of the pre-Julian Roman calendar. At the time, it was known as the Year of the Consulship of Vibulanus and Iullus (or, less frequently, year 272 Ab urbe condita). The denomination 482 BC for this year has been used since the early medieval period, when the Anno Domini calendar era became the prevalent method in Europe for naming years.

Events 
 By place 

 Greece 
 The Athenian archon Themistocles secures the ostracism of his opponents and becomes the political leader of Athens. The Athenian soldier and statesman, Aristides, is one of those ostracised due to his opposition to Themistocles' naval policy.

 China 
 While King Fuchai of Wu attends a meeting in Huangchi, in an attempt to gain hegemony over all the other duchies of Zhou Dynasty China, his capital city in the State of Wu is captured in a surprise assault by King Goujian of Yue. In 473 BC the State of Wu will finally be annexed by the State of Yue.

 Rome 
 Continuation of hostilities with the Aequi.
 Continuation of hostilities with Veii.  The Veientine army enters Roman territory and ravages the countryside.

Births

Deaths

References